Brainwashed is a not-for-profit music website supporting eclectic music. Brainwashed features news, reviews, a podcast, hosts websites for many musical artists and record labels, and has organized two music festivals, Brainwaves. Over fifty people contribute to the archives of Brainwashed. Brainwashed also releases music as Brainwashed Recordings.

History
Brainwashed.com was launched on April 16, 1996 for the purpose of hosting Web sites for various musical artists. The sites contained news, discography, press releases, interviews, photos, merchandise, sound files, lyrics, tour dates when available. The original sites included Meat Beat Manifesto, Greater Than One, Coil, Throbbing Gristle, The Legendary Pink Dots, Nurse With Wound, Current 93, and Cabaret Voltaire. Sites like Meat Beat Manifesto, Coil, and the Legendary Pink Dots were recognized by the artists as official at the time and the URLs were printed in numerous releases, others like Throbbing Gristle, Nurse With Wound, Current 93, and Cabaret Voltaire weren't regarded as official, however were, at the time, the most comprehensive sources for those acts and were often referenced in books (such as Wreckers of Civilisation: The Story of COUM Transmissions & Throbbing Gristle by Simon Ford and England's Hidden Reverse by David Keenan) and magazine articles (such as ones from The Wire).

In 1997, Brainwashed began hosting web sites for record labels including Kranky, RRRecords, Thrill Jockey, and Happy Go Lucky Records, and later hosted sites for Tigerbeat6, Important Records, and World Serpent Distribution. In 1998, Brainwashed launched The Brain, a weekly digest of music news, reviews, new releases, tour dates, and other information about some of the artists and labels hosted on Brainwashed. The Brain was folded into Brainwashed.com in 2005.

Brainwashed Recordings

In 1999, Brainwashed began a small recording label as an extension of the website to issue short run releases of acts who had pages on brainwashed.com.

Brainwashed Handmade releases
Brainwashed Recordings also has a series, Brainwashed Handmade, which features low run CDs in letter-pressed sleeves.

Brainwashed Archives releases
Brainwashed Recordings also has a sub-label, Brainwashed Archives, which specializes in deluxe remastered reissues.

Killer Pimp releases
Brainwashed Recordings also has a sub-label, Killer Pimp, which has released albums by Kate Mosh, Noise/Girl, Blood Money, and A Place To Bury Strangers.

Brainwashed Radio and podcast
In 2000, Brainwashed launched a 24-hour streaming radio station which featured music from the artists and labels that were hosted at brainwashed.com. The stream was discontinued in 2004.

The first episode of Brainwashed Radio: The Podcast Edition was published on December 4, 2004. It primarily features music reviewed and promoted on Brainwashed.com. New episodes are produced and published on average on a weekly basis. In 2016, the podcast incorporated interviews from musical artists on several episodes.

The Eye
The Eye was a video segment that was launched first on May 4, 2003, featuring miniature documentaries on musical acts containing interviews and live footage. Nearly 150 segments were produced.

Brainwaves Festival
The Brainwaves Festival took place on November 17–19, 2006, at the Regent Theater in Arlington, Massachusetts, to celebrate the first 10 years of Brainwashed.com. Performing artists included Z'EV, Nadja, Troum, The Dresden Dolls, Cock ESP, Howard Stelzer, V/Vm, Goodiepal, Greg Davis, Keith Fullerton Whitman, Landing, Aranos, Volcano the Bear, Jessica Bailiff, Christoph Heemann, Windy & Carl, and Thighpaulsandra.

A second Brainwaves Festival took place on November 21–23, 2008, at the Regent Theater again. Performing artists included Marissa Nadler, Silver Apples, Meat Beat Manifesto, Glenn Jones, Nmperign, Major Stars, Rivulets, Gary Wilson, His Name Is Alive, Andrew Liles, Reformed Faction, Little Annie, The Threshold HouseBoys Choir, Matmos, Windy Weber and Benoit Pioulard, Nudge, Boduf Songs, and Stars of the Lid.

See also
 Songs of the Week by Coil
 List of record labels
 Music podcast

References

External links
 
Brainwashed Radio - The Podcast Edition

Online music magazines published in the United States
Internet properties established in 1996
1996 establishments in the United States
American record labels
Music podcasts
Music festivals established in 2006
Electronic music festivals in the United States
2004 podcast debuts